Sudeepa Raparthi (born 28 February 1987), better known by her stage name, Sudeepa Pinky, is an Indian actress who predominantly appears in Telugu cinema.

She started giving stage performances at the age of 3, and learned classical dance from her parents Raparthi Surya Narayana and Raparthi Satyavathi who are also classical dancers, running the Satya Sri dance academy. Her father was adopted by Shri Killada Satyam Garu, a dance master who was also a classical dancer and who holds the record of performing dance continuously for 42 hours.

In 1994 she entered the Telugu movie industry with M. Dharmaraju M.A, directed by Raviraja Pinnesetty. Nuvvu Naaku Nachav is a milestone in her career. She was also a contestant in Super 2. She was eliminated in episode 3 on 11 July 2016 because she didn't dare to attempt the stunt. She was the first contestant to be eliminated.

She also entered television industry known for her roles in Kotha Bangaram and Prathighatana.

Filmography
All films are in Telugu, Otherwise Language is noted.

Television

References 

1987 births
Living people
Actresses in Telugu cinema
Indian film actresses
20th-century Indian actresses
21st-century Indian actresses
Actresses in Tamil cinema
Bigg Boss (Telugu TV series) contestants